Late Night at Largo is a live album by Tom Brosseau. The album was produced by Mark Flanagan and engineered by Scott Fritz at Largo in Los Angeles, California.

Album insight
There was no audience present during the recording of Late Night at Largo, as it was recorded after the nightclub's open hours. "How To Grow A Woman From The Ground", "Maryanne", "Lonesome Valley", and "Fragile Mind" were later included on Brosseau's FatCat Records debut, Empty Houses Are Lonely.

Packaging
Stumptown Printers of Portland, Oregon created custom packaging for Late Night at Largo, which features a 6-panel recycled cardboard Compact Disc holder, liner notes printed on recycled paper, complete with a watermark, and soy-based ink. This album was released independently on Compact Disc only.

Guitar
Tom Brosseau used a dreadnought acoustic guitar for the recording of Late Night at Largo, manufactured by the Santa Cruz Guitar Company in Santa Cruz, California. Engineer Scott Fritz mixed the album using both the guitar's Highlander iP-1 Pickup and Preamp system and a common room microphone. Details of this setup were photographed by Mark Flanagan and used as paneling shots for the Compact Disc packaging.

Track listing
"Still Building"
"Maryanne"
"Kick Matilda Out of Bed"
"Rose"
"Lonesome Valley"
"How to Grow a Woman from the Ground"
"Portrait of George Washington"
"Broken Ukulele"
"Reallife Video Game (Do What You Want)"
"Fragile Mind"
"Young and Free"
"Don’t Get Around Much Anymore" (Composed by Duke Ellington and Bob Russell, arranged and adapted by Tom Brosseau)

Personnel
Tom Brosseau: Vocals, harmonica, acoustic guitar

References

Tom Brosseau albums
2004 live albums